Pacific Islander Americans (also known as Oceanian Americans) are Americans who are of Pacific Islander ancestry (or are descendants of the indigenous peoples of Oceania or of Austronesian descent). For its purposes, the United States census also counts Aboriginal Australians as part of this group.

Pacific Islander Americans make up 0.5% of the U.S. population including those with partial Pacific Islander ancestry, enumerating about 1.4 million people. The largest ethnic subgroups of Pacific Islander Americans are Native Hawaiians, Samoans, Chamorros, Fijians, Marshalleses, Tongans, and Tahitians.

American Samoa, Guam, and the Northern Mariana Islands are insular areas (U.S. territories), while Hawaii is a state.

History

First stage: Hawaiian migration (18th-19th centuries) 

Migration from Oceania to the United States began in the last decade of the 18th century, but the first migrants to arrive in the country were natives of Hawaii. People from other Oceanian backgrounds (except Australians and Māori) did not migrate to the United States until the late 19th century. The first Native Hawaiians to live in the present-day United States were fur traders. They were hired by British fur traders in Hawaii and taken to the northwestern United States, from where trade networks developed with Honolulu. However, they charged less than Americans for doing the same jobs and returned to Hawaii when their contracts ended. The first Native Hawaiians to live permanently in the United States settled in the Astoria colony (in present-day Oregon) in 1811, having been brought there by its founder, fur merchant John Jacob Astor. Astor created the Pacific Fur Company in the colony and used the Native Hawaiians to build the city's infrastructure and houses and to develop the primary sector (agriculture, hunting and fishing). The labor employment of the Native Hawaiians was done to make them serve the company (although later, most of them worked for North West Company when this company absorbed the Pacific Fur Company in 1813).

After 1813, Native Hawaiians continued to migrate to the Pacific Northwest. They migrated to work in companies such as the Hudson's Bay Company (which absorbed the North West Company in 1821) and the Columbia Fishing and Trading Company, as well as in Christian missions. Since 1819, some groups of Polynesian Protestant students immigrated to the United States to study theology. Since the 1830s, another group of Native Hawaiians arrived on California's shores, where they were traders and formed communities. So, they made up 10% of the population of Yerba Buena, now San Francisco, in 1847. During the California Gold Rush, many other Native Hawaiians migrated to California to work as miners.

In 1889, the first Polynesian Mormon colony was founded in Utah and consisted of Native Hawaiians, Tahitians, Samoans, and Māori. Also in the late 19th century, small groups of Pacific Islanders, usually sailors, moved to the western shores, mainly on San Francisco. Later, the U.S. occupied Hawaii in 1896, Guam in 1898, and American Samoa in 1900. This fact diversified Oceanian emigration in the United States.

Second stage (20th-21st centuries) 
However, the first record of non-Hawaiian Pacific Islanders in the United States is from 1910, with the first Guamanians living in the United States. In the following decades small groups of people from islands such as Hawaii, Guam, Tonga, or American Samoa emigrated to the United States. Many of them were Mormons (including most of Tongans and American Samoans), who emigrated to help build Mormon churches, or to seek an education, either in Laie or Salt Lake City. However, the emigration of Pacific Islanders to the U.S. was small until the end of World War II, when many American Samoans,  Guamanians (who got the American citizenship in 1929), and Tongans emigrated to the United States. Most of them were in the military or married with military people, but some Pacific Islanders, particularly Tongans, looked for a job in several religious and cultural centers. Since then the emigration increased and diversified every decade, with a majority emigrating to the Western urban areas and Hawaii.

This increase and diversification in the Oceanian emigration was especially true in the 1950s. In 1950, the population of Guam gained full American citizenship. In 1952, the natives of American Samoa become American nationals, although not American citizens, through the Immigration and Nationality Act of 1952. Shortly thereafter, the first major waves of migration from American Samoa and Guam emerged, while other groups of places such as French Polynesia, Palau, or Fiji began to emigrate. Over 5,100 Pacific Islanders emigrated to the United States in the 1950s, mostly from American Samoa, Guam, and Tonga. The first of them were Samoan military personnel, who had worked at the American bases of Pago Pago but moved to the Honolulu's American bases when American Samoa began to be administered by the United States Department of the Interior, as well as their relatives. Most of the new Pacific Islander immigrants were Mormons and many islanders from the region emigrated to the United States seeking economic opportunities.

In 1959, Hawaii became a state and its natives got U.S. citizenship. This made more than 630,000 people Americans; many of them were Pacific Islanders, both Native Hawaiians and people of other Oceanian origins. Thus, the Hawaiian migration to the continental U.S. began to increase. In the 1960s, many more Pacific Islanders emigrated to the U.S., mainly due to increased migration from Guam, Fiji, Tonga, and Samoa archipelago (both independent and American Samoa). The Pacific Islanders migrated by diverse reasons: Many Guamanians fled the Korean War and Typhoon Karen, and the Fijian population living in the U.S. skyrocketed from a few dozen people in the 1950s to more than 400 people. The Pacific Islander migration increased especially since 1965, when the United States government facilitated the non-European migration to the U.S. Many of them were recruited to pick fruit in California.

During the 1970s, over nine thousand Pacific Islanders migrated to the U.S., mostly from Samoa (both Western and American), Guam, Tonga, and Fiji, but also from other islands such as Federated States of Micronesia or Palau. Many of these people emigrated to the U.S. to study at its universities. Moreover, in the 1980s, migration from the Pacific Islands to the United States became more diversified when this country acquired the Northern Marianas Islands in 1986 and signed an agreement with TTPI (FSM, Palau and the Marshall Islands) called the Compact of Free Association. The Compact of Free Association allows the inhabitants from TTPI to travel and work in the United States without visas. On the other hand, the Tyson Foods company, which employed a significant part of the population of the Marshall Islands, relocated many of its Marshellese employees in Springdale, Arkansas, where the company is based. However, most of Pacific Islanders continued to migrate to western urban areas and Hawaii. More of five thousand Pacific Islanders migrated to the United States in the 1990s, settling mostly in western cities such as Los Angeles, San Francisco, Seattle, or Salt Lake City. In the 2000 United States census, almost all the countries of Oceania were mentioned, although only the ethnic groups mentioned in the article consisted of thousands of people. In the 2000s and 2010s, several thousands more Pacific Islanders emigrated to the United States.

Population

Demography 
In the 2000 and 2010 censuses, the term "Native Hawaiian or other Pacific Islander" refers to people having origins in any of the original peoples of Hawaii, Guam, Tonga, Samoa, Fiji, New Zealand, and the Marshalls or other Pacific Islands. Most of the Pacific Islander Americans are of Native Hawaiian, Samoan, and Chamorro origin.

The fact that Hawaii is a U.S. state (meaning that almost the entire native Hawaiian population lives in the U.S.), as well as the migration, high birth rate and miscegenation of the Pacific Islanders have favored the permanence and increase of this population in the U.S. (especially in the number of people who are of partial Pacific Islander descent). In the 2000 census, over 800,000 people claimed to be of Pacific Islander descent and in the 2010 census 1,225,195 Americans claimed "'Native Hawaiian or other Pacific Islander'" as their race alone or in combination. Most of them live in urban areas of Hawaii and California, but they also have sizeable populations in Washington, Utah, Nevada, Oregon, Texas, Florida, Arizona, and New York. On the other hand, Pacific Islander Americans represent the majority (or are the main ethnic group) in American Samoa, Guam, and the Northern Mariana Islands, from where many of them are natives.

Areas of origin

Melanesian Americans 
Melanesian Americans are Americans of Melanesian descent.

Most of them are of Fijian descent. Most of Fijian Americans are of Fijian and Indian descent. More than 32,000 people of Fijian origin live in the U.S. Most of them live in California.

Smaller communities of Papuan, Vanuatuan, and Solomon Islander origin also live in the U.S.

Micronesian Americans 
Micronesian Americans are Americans of Micronesian descent or are Americans whose origins are in the Federated States of Micronesia.

There are more than 8,000 people living in the U.S. whose origins are in the Federated States of Micronesia. Most of them live in Hawaii, California, Oregon, and Texas, as well as in Mariana Islands. Another 7,000 Americans are of Palauan descent.

According to the 2010 census, the largest Chamorro populations were located in California, Washington, and Texas, but their combined number from these three states totaled less than half the number living throughout the U.S. It also revealed that the Chamorro people are the most geographically dispersed Oceanian ethnicity in the country.

Marshallese Americans or Marshallese come from the Marshall Islands. In the 2010 census, 22,434 Americans identified as being of Marshallese descent.

Because of the Marshall Islands entering the Compact of Free Association in 1986, Marshallese have been allowed to migrate and work in the United States. There are many reasons why Marshallese came to the United States. Some Marshallese came for educational opportunities, particularly for their children. Others sought work or better health care than what is available in the islands. Massive layoffs by the Marshallese government in 2000 led to a second big wave of immigration.

Arkansas has the largest Marshallese population with over 6,000 residents. Many live in Springdale, and the Marshallese comprise over 5% of the city's population. Other significant Marshallese populations include Spokane and Costa Mesa.

Smaller communities of I-Kiribati and Nauruan origins also live in the U.S.

Polynesian Americans 
Polynesian Americans are Americans of Polynesian descent.

Large subcategories of Polynesian Americans include Native Hawaiians and Samoan Americans. In addition there are smaller communities of Tongan Americans, French Polynesian Americans, and Māori Americans.

A Samoan American is an American who is of ethnic Samoan descent from either the independent nation Samoa or the American territory of American Samoa. Samoan American is a subcategory of Polynesian American. About 55,000 people live on American Samoa, while the U.S. censuses in 2000 and 2008 has found 4 times the number of Samoan Americans live in the mainland U.S.

California has the most Samoans; concentrations live in the San Francisco Bay Area, Los Angeles County, and San Diego County. San Francisco has approximately 2,000 people of Samoan ancestry, and other Bay Area cities such as East Palo Alto and Daly City have Samoan communities. In Los Angeles County, Long Beach and Carson have abundant Samoan communities, as well as in Oceanside in San Diego County. Other West Coast metropolitan areas such as Seattle have strong Samoan communities, mainly in King County and in Tacoma. Anchorage, Alaska, and Honolulu, Hawaii, both have thousands of Samoan Americans residing in each city.

Persons born in American Samoa are United States nationals, but not United States citizens (this is the only circumstance under which an individual would be one and not the other). For this reason, Samoans can move to Hawaii or the mainland United States and obtain citizenship comparatively easily. Like Hawaiian Americans, the Samoans arrived in the mainland in the 20th century as agricultural laborers and factory workers.

Elsewhere in the United States, Samoan Americans are plentiful throughout the state of Utah, as well as in Killeen, Texas; Norfolk, Virginia; and Independence, Missouri.

A Tongan American is an American who is of ethnic Tongan descent. Utah has the largest Tongan American population, followed by Hawaii. Many of the first Tongan Americans came to the United States in connection to the Church of Jesus Christ of Latter-day Saints.

Pacific Islander Americans in the 2000 and 2010 United States censuses

Location

Military
Based on 2003 recruiting data, Pacific Islander Americans were 249% over-represented in the military.

American Samoans are distinguished among the wider Pacific Islander group for enthusiasm for enlistment. In 2007, a Chicago Tribune reporter covering the island's military service noted, "American Samoa is one of the few places in the nation where military recruiters not only meet their enlistment quotas but soundly exceed them." , there have been 10 American Samoans who have died in Iraq, and 2 who have died in Afghanistan.

Pacific Islander Americans are also represented in the United States Navy SEALs, making up .6% of the enlisted and .1% of the officers.

Notes

References

External links
The Native Hawaiian and Other Pacific Islander Population: 2010 Census
Infoplease: Native Hawaiian and Other U.S. Pacific Islander Population, Census 2000 - 2010
Pacific Islander Populations, Census 2000

Ethnic groups in the United States
American people of Micronesian descent
American people of Melanesian descent
American people of Polynesian descent
Pacific Islands American